Absolute Greatness is the debut album by American rapper Willie the Kid. It was released on September 30, 2008 through Aphilliates Music Group, Embassy Entertainment and Asylum Records.

Background
Aphilliates crewmember and a protégé of DJ Drama, the Grand Rapids, Michigan-born rapper known as Willie the Kid presents his debut studio album, Absolute Greatness. With the keen eye of an observant ghetto poet, WTK portrays vivid street narratives over tracks by Drama, V12 Da Hitman and Don Cannon. La the Darkman, Bobby V, Bun B, Gucci Mane, Lonnie Mac, Yung Joc, and Trey Songz are also featured.

Track listing
 "Thang Back" (Produced By Don Cannon)
 "Long Live the Prince" (Produced By Detroit Red) 
 "Coogi Down" (featuring La the Darkman) (Produced By Shotti)
 "Pressure" (Produced By The Runners)
 "You" (featuring Bobby V) (Produced By V12)
 "Love for Money" (featuring Trey Songz, Gucci Mane, La the Darkman, Bun B, Flo Rida, Yung Joc) (Produced By V12)
 "We Get Down" (featuring La the Darkman) (Produced By V12)
 "Splendid!" (Produced By V12)
 "The W" (featuring Jovan Dias) (Produced By Detroit Red)
 "Let 'Em Know" (featuring Lonnie Mac & La the Darkman) (Produced By V12)
 "When the Lights Darken" (featuring Rock City) (Produced By V12)
 "What They Wanna Hear" (Produced By Don Cannon)
 "Driven." (Produced By Vess Dynamic & Ron Boogie)
Bonus Tracks
 "A New Day"  (featuring Cory Gunz & Marvo)
 "Sound Like Money"

Charts

References

2008 albums
Willie the Kid (rapper) albums